The Ministry of Development, Industry and Foreign Trade (abbreviated MDIC) was a cabinet-level federal ministry in Brazil. The last Minister of Development, Industry and Foreign Trade is Marcos Jorge de Lima. Currently the ministry is part of the Ministry of the Economy

The ministry used to oversee the Brazilian National Bank for Economic and Social Development (BNDES), the National Institute of Industrial Property (INPI), the National Institute of Metrology, Quality and Technology (INMETRO) and the Superintendence of the Manaus Free Trade Zone (SUFRAMA). The minister of Development, Industry and Foreign Trade also chairs the Chamber of Foreign Trade (CAMEX), a 7-ministers of State board linked to the Presidency of the Republic.

References

External links
 Official site

Government ministries of Brazil
Industry in Brazil
Foreign trade of Brazil